The former Scott County Courthouse is located at 252 South Main Street in Waldron, Arkansas.  The current facility is located on 1st Street.  The old courthouse is a two-story brick Art Deco building, set on a high foundation, and with a flat roof that has a parapet.  The building was designed by Bassham & Wheeler of Fort Smith, and was built in 1934 with funding from the Works Progress Administration.  It replaced an older building on the same site that was destroyed by fire.

The building was listed on the National Register of Historic Places in 1989; it is also a contributing element to the Waldron Commercial Historic District.

See also
National Register of Historic Places listings in Scott County, Arkansas

References

Courthouses on the National Register of Historic Places in Arkansas
Art Deco architecture in Arkansas
Government buildings completed in 1933
Buildings and structures in Scott County, Arkansas
National Register of Historic Places in Scott County, Arkansas
Historic district contributing properties in Arkansas
Courthouses in Arkansas